Maurice Voron (1928-2004) was a French rugby league footballer who played in the 1950s and 1960s.

Career
Voron mostly played for Lyon for most of his club career.
He had 27 caps for France national rugby league team, from 1951 to 1960, playing at the 1954 and 1957 Rugby League World Cups and touring Australasia. A three-quarter, in 1988 he was inducted into the International Rugby League Hall of Fame.

During the 1959–60 Kangaroo tour's French leg, Voron was selected to play in the first of two Tests for France on the wing.

Outside the game, he worked as journalist in Aveyron.

References

1928 births
2004 deaths
French rugby league players
France national rugby league team players
Lyon Villeurbanne XIII players
Rugby league wingers
Sportspeople from Lyon Metropolis
People from Oullins